Petrophile teretifolia is a species of flowering plant in the family Proteaceae and is endemic to southwestern Western Australia. It is a shrub with needle-shaped but blunt-pointed leaves, and oval to more or less spherical heads of hairy pink to mauve flowers.

Description

Taxonomy
Petrophile teretifolia was first formally described in 1810 by Robert Brown in Transactions of the Linnean Society of London. The specific epithet (teretifolia) means "terete-leaved".

Distribution and habitat
Petrophile teretifolia grows on granite outcrops, in heath, scub and sandplain between the Stirling Range and Israelite Bay in the Esperance Plains, Jarrah Forest and Mallee biogeographic regions of south-western Western Australia.

Conservation status
This petrophile is classified as "not threatened" by the Western Australian Government Department of Parks and Wildlife.

References

teretifolia
Eudicots of Western Australia
Endemic flora of Western Australia
Plants described in 1810
Taxa named by Robert Brown (botanist, born 1773)